This article is a list of notable individuals who were born in, or are strongly associated with Aspen, Colorado. It is organized by field of primary notability, then by last name within each section.

Aspen is the home rule municipality that is the county seat of Pitkin County, Colorado, United States. Its population was 6,658 at the 2010 United States Census.

Arts 
Robert Baer (born 1952), author, political commentator, and former CIA case officer
John Denver (1943–1997), singer-songwriter, record producer, actor, activist, and humanitarian
Ethel Fortner (1907–1987), poet, critic, and editor
Goldie Hawn (born 1945), actress
Don Johnson (born 1949), actor
Jack Nicholson (born 1937), actor
Bob Rafelson (born 1933), film director, writer and producer
Kurt Russell (born 1951), actor
Maria Semple (born 1964), novelist and screenwriter
Paul Soldner (1921–2011), ceramic artist known for experimenting with Japanese raku technique
Robert Spano (born 1961), conductor and pianist, music director of the Aspen Music Festival and School
Jill St. John (born 1940), actress
Robert Wagner (born 1930), actor

Business 
 Thomas H. Bailey (born 1936 or 1937), financier who founded Janus Capital Group
 Harley Baldwin (1945–2005), developer and art dealer
 Harry W. Bass Jr. (1927–1998), businessman and philanthropist
 Whip Jones (1909–2001), ski industry pioneer and original operator of the Aspen Highlands ski area
Julie Macklowe, founder and spokesperson of skincare brand vbeauté
Klaus Obermeyer (born 1919), founder of Sport Obermeyer
Walter Paepcke (1896–1960), industrialist, founder of the Aspen Institute, Aspen Skiing Company and Aspen Music Festival and School
Mortimer Zuckerman (born 1937), Canadian-American billionaire media proprietor and investor

Crime 
 James Hogue (born 1959), con man who entered Princeton University by posing as a self-taught orphan
 Nancy Pfister (1956–2014), tour guide and murder victim

Journalism 
 Hazel Hunkins Hallinan (1890–1982), women's rights activist, journalist, and suffragist
 Dave Price (born 1962), founder and publisher of several free daily newspapers
Harold Ross (1892–1951),  co-founder and editor-in-chief of The New Yorker magazine

Philanthropy 
 Mercedes Bass (born 1944), Iranian-American philanthropist and socialite
 Melva Bucksbaum (1933–2015), art collector and patron of the arts
 Barbara Ingalls Shook (1938–2008), heiress, patron of the arts, and philanthropist
Carrie Morgridge (born 1967), philanthropist and author
Elizabeth Paepcke (1902–1994), philanthropist and booster for Aspen, founded the Aspen Music Festival and School

Politics 
 Nancy E. Dick (born 1930), 41st Lieutenant Governor of Colorado
 Helen Klanderud (1937–2013), mayor of Aspen from 2001 to 2007
Davis Hanson Waite (1825–1901), Governor of Colorado from 1893 to 1895
Adam Frisch, who served on the Aspen City Council from 2011 to 2019, ran in 2022 election for U.S. House of Representatives against Lauren Boebert, and the election was the closest nation-wide, not resolved for weeks.  Purported scandal regarding Aspen City Council tenure was put out in last week(s) of the campaign.

Science 
George Lof (1913–2009), engineer and inventor in the field of solar energy research
Robert R. Odén (1922–2008), orthopedic surgeon and team doctor of the United States Ski Team during the 1960 Winter Olympics

Sports 
Jeremy Abbott (born 1985), professional figure skater, bronze medallist at the 2014 Winter Olympics
Susie Berning (born 1941), retired professional golfer, winner of four major women's championships
Gretchen Bleiler (born 1981), former professional halfpipe snowboarder
Andrew Ernemann (born 1976), former alpine ski racer
Alex Ferreira (born 1994), professional half-pipe skier, silver medallist at the 2018 Winter Olympics
Alexi Grewal (born 1960), retired professional road racing cyclist, gold medallist at the 1984 Summer Olympics
Noah Hoffman (born 1989), American Olympic cross-country skier
Chris Klug (born 1972), professional alpine snowboarder, bronze medallist at the 2002 Winter Olympics
Beth Madsen (born 1964), former professional alpine skier, competed in the 1988 Winter Olympics
Wiley Maple (born 1990), alpine skier in the downhill and super-G disciplines, competed in the 2018 Winter Olympics
 Max Marolt (1936–2003), alpine skier, competed in the 1960 Winter Olympics
 Andrea Mead Lawrence (1932–2009), first American alpine skier to win two Olympic gold medals
 Jere Michael (born 1977), former competitive figure skater, later coach
 Abigail Mickey (born 1990),  former professional racing cyclist
 Andy Mill (born 1953), former alpine ski racer, competed in the 1976 and 1980 Winter Olympics
 Alec Parker (born 1974), former rugby union lock
 Monique Pelletier (born 1969), former alpine skier, competed in the 1992 and 1994 Winter Olympics
 Jessica Phillips (born 1978), competitive road cyclist
 Janelle Smiley (born 1981), ski mountaineer and mountain climber
 Alex Wubbels (born 1976), nurse and former alpine skier, competed in the 1998 and 2002 Winter Olympics
 Torin Yater-Wallace (born 1995), Professional Freeskier, Three time X Games Gold Medalist, Competed in 2014 Winter Olympics and 2018 Winter Olympics.freestyle skier

Miscellaneous 
Aron Ralston (born 1975),  outdoorsman and motivational speaker best known for surviving a canyoneering accident by cutting off his own arm
Christy Smith (born 1978), contestant on reality television series Survivor: The Amazon; first deaf contestant in the Survivor franchise

References 

Aspen

Aspen, Colorado